The Three Musketeers is a 1939 musical comedy film adaptation of Alexandre Dumas's 1844 novel The Three Musketeers directed by Alan Dwan and starring Don Ameche as d'Artagnan, with the Ritz Brothers as his cowardly helpers.

Plot summary

Cast
 Don Ameche as d'Artagnan
 Ritz Brothers as Three Lackeys
 Binnie Barnes as Milady de Winter
 Gloria Stuart as Queen Anne
 Pauline Moore as Lady Constance
 Joseph Schildkraut as King Louis XIII
 John Carradine as Naveau
 Lionel Atwill as De Rochefort
 Miles Mander as Cardinal Richelieu
 Douglass Dumbrille as Athos (as Douglas Dumbrille)
 John 'Dusty' King as Aramis (as John King)
 Russell Hicks as Porthos
 Gregory Gaye as Vitray
 Lester Matthews as Duke of Buckingham
 Egon Brecher as Landlord
 Moroni Olsen as Bailiff
 Georges Renavent as Captain Fageon
 C. Montague Shaw as Ship Captain (as Montague Shaw)

Songs 
Music: Samuel Pokrass, lyrics: Walter Bullock.
 d'Artagnan song (Vara-vara-vara), Don Ameche.
 Chicken Soup, Ritz Brothers.
 Voila, Ritz Brothers.
 My Lady, Don Ameche.

Reception
Frank Nugent, critic for New York Times, wrote, "That isn't a buzzing in your ears you've been hearing; it's Dumas, fils, spinning in his grave as the Ritz Brothers play his 'Three Musketeers' ... It seems ironic that Mr. Zanuck's first attempt to deal reverently with a classic—in every respect but the Ritzes' share in it—should be impeded by its very reverence to the classic.  The trouble, it appears, is that his burlesques are too serious and that his serious efforts are too often burlesques."

In the Leave it to Beaver episode, "The Book Report" (1963), young Beaver Cleaver gets in trouble at school when he is assigned to write a book report about the Dumas novel, but instead of actually doing his homework and reading it, just watches the movie on television and bases his report on the film's comedic scenes and Ritz Brothers' zany antics.

References

External links
 
 
 
 

1939 films
1930s historical adventure films
1939 musical comedy films
American musical comedy films
American black-and-white films
Films based on The Three Musketeers
American swashbuckler films
Films directed by Allan Dwan
Films set in the 1620s
Films set in France
Films set in Paris
20th Century Fox films
Cultural depictions of Cardinal Richelieu
Cultural depictions of Louis XIII
American historical adventure films
1930s American films